US Post Office-Forest Hills Station is a historic post office building located at Forest Hills in Queens County, New York, United States. It was built in 1937, and was designed by architect Lorimer Rich as a consultant to the Office of the Supervising Architect.  It is a one-story flat roofed building clad with reddish brown terra cotta above a base of granite in the International style.  It features exterior terra cotta relief sculptures by artist Sten Jacobsson.

The post office is located on the eastbound frontage road of Queens Boulevard (the former Hoffman Boulevard) on the southwest corner of 70th Avenue across from MacDonald Park. It was listed on the National Register of Historic Places in 1988.

References

Forest Hills
Government buildings completed in 1937
International style architecture in New York City
Government buildings in Queens, New York
Forest Hills, Queens
National Register of Historic Places in Queens, New York
1937 establishments in New York City